Emerson Santana Deocleciano (born 27 July 1999), sometimes known as Baiano, is a Brazilian professional footballer who plays as a forward for Rīgas FS.

Career
Deocleciano started his career with Vila Nova, playing for them in the Campeonato Goiano in 2018. In June 2019, he joined Croatian First Football League side NK Lokomotiva on an initial one-year loan deal. On 4 August 2019, he made his professional debut as a substitute in a 3–0 loss to Hajduk Split. Deocleciano's deal with Lokomotiva was later made permanent and in February 2020, he was loaned out to Virsliga side Rīgas FS.

Career statistics

References

1999 births
Living people
Brazilian footballers
Association football forwards
Vila Nova Futebol Clube players
NK Lokomotiva Zagreb players
FK RFS players
Croatian Football League players
Latvian Higher League players
Brazilian expatriate footballers
Expatriate footballers in Croatia
Expatriate footballers in Latvia
Brazilian expatriate sportspeople in Croatia
Brazilian expatriate sportspeople in Latvia